Chamith Kosala Bandara Kulasekara (born 15 July 1985) is a professional Sri Lankan cricketer. He is an all-rounder, batting right-handed and bowling right-arm fast medium.

Domestic career
He played domestic cricket for the Nondescripts Cricket Club and the Ruhuna Rhinos. He is also a member of Western Troopers in SLC Super 4's T20 tournament. In April 2018, he was named in Dambulla's squad for the 2018 Super Provincial One Day Tournament.

He was a part of 2004 Sri Lanka's ICC Youth World Cup squad. He played his u19 cricket alongside Upul Tharanga, Farveez Maharoof, Kaushal Silva and Suraj Randiv.

He performed commendably during the u19 World Cup in Bangladesh and won Man of the Match awards for his 5/27 vs Canada and 37 runs vs Zimbabwe.

Later in his career, he moved to Baduraliya SC.

International career
He has played in one Test, where he made his debut against Pakistan in 2011 at Sharjah. He made ODI debut in the same tour against Pakistan on 11 November 2011 at Dubai.

See also
 One-Test wonder

References

Living people
1985 births
Sri Lanka Test cricketers
Sri Lanka One Day International cricketers
Nondescripts Cricket Club cricketers
Sri Lankan cricketers
Ruhuna cricketers
Kandurata Warriors cricketers
Galle Cricket Club cricketers
Wayamba cricketers
Kandurata cricketers
Asian Games medalists in cricket
Cricketers at the 2014 Asian Games
Asian Games gold medalists for Sri Lanka
Medalists at the 2014 Asian Games